Malik Jalal is a tribal elder from Waziristan, Pakistan. He is an intermediary in settling local disputes and a senior member of the North Waziristan peace committee (NWPC). The aim of the NWPC is to establish peace between the Taliban and the Government of Pakistan.

Jalal claims to have been the target of multiple drone strikes which failed to hit him and speaks out against drone strikes in Pakistan by the United States. He was invited to the United Kingdom by Ken Macdonald to address parliament about being on a drone kill list.

References

People from North Waziristan
Living people
Year of birth missing (living people)